The 1968 Israel Super Cup was the fifth Israel Super Cup, an annual Israeli football match played between the winners of the previous season's Top Division and Israel State Cup. As the match was not set by the Israel Football Association, it was considered an unofficial cup, with a trophy donated by the Maccabi Association.

The match was played between Maccabi Tel Aviv, champions of the 1966–68 Liga Leumit and Bnei Yehuda, winners of the 1967–68 Israel State Cup. At the match, played at Bloomfield Stadium, Maccabi Tel Aviv won 2–1.

Match details

References

1968
Super Cup
Super Cup 1968
Super Cup 1968
Israel Super Cup matches